Wesley Pionteck Souza (born 14 April 1996), simply known as Wesley, is a Brazilian footballer who plays for Sampaio Corrêa. Mainly a winger, he can also play as a wing back.

Club career
Born in Orlândia, São Paulo, Wesley graduated with Botafogo-SP's youth setup, after being a sprinter when young. He made his senior debuts in 2014, appearing in that year's Copa Paulista.

After being one of the Botafogo's best performers in the 2015 Copa São Paulo de Futebol Júnior (in which the club finished second), Wesley made his professional debut on 31 January, starting and assisting Rodrigo Andrade in a 1–0 away win against Rio Claro for the Campeonato Paulista championship. He scored his first goal on 8 February, netting his team's only in a 1–1 home draw against Ponte Preta.

Wesley finished the tournament with 14 appearances and one goal, and was linked to Flamengo, Palmeiras and Lille OSC. On 27 May, however, it was confirmed that Botafogo-SP had sold the majority of his rights to an investment group, BMG, who placed him with Santos in their Under 23 team.

During the 2017 season, Wesley had a secondary loan spell at his former club Botafogo-SP. He was the top goalscorer for the side during the 2017 Série C. As a result he signed a further loan agreement for the 2018 season with the club.

In December he agreed a contract with Bragantino for the 2019 season. He became part of the Red Bull Bragantino squad when CA Bragantino merged with Red Bull Brasil in April 2019.

Career statistics

Honours 
Bragantino
Campeonato Brasileiro Série B: 2019

References

External links

1996 births
Living people
People from Orlândia
Brazilian footballers
Association football wingers
Campeonato Brasileiro Série C players
Campeonato Brasileiro Série B players
Campeonato Brasileiro Série A players
Botafogo Futebol Clube (SP) players
Santos FC players
Clube Atlético Bragantino players
Red Bull Bragantino players
Esporte Clube Vitória players
Esporte Clube Água Santa players
Sampaio Corrêa Futebol Clube players
Footballers from São Paulo (state)